"Sweetest Thing" is a song by Irish rock band U2. It was originally released as a B-side on the "Where the Streets Have No Name" single in 1987. The song was later re-recorded and re-released as a single in October 1998 for the band's compilation album The Best of 1980–1990.

"Sweetest Thing" became a number-one hit in Ireland, Canada, and Iceland and reached the top 10 in several countries, including Australia, New Zealand, Spain, Sweden, and the United Kingdom. In the United States, the song peaked at number 63 on the Billboard Hot 100 and number nine on the Billboard Modern Rock Tracks chart.

Writing and recording
The song was written by Bono as an apology to his wife, Ali Hewson, for forgetting her birthday during The Joshua Tree sessions. 

In 1998, a new version of the song was recorded for inclusion on the group's greatest hits compilation The Best of 1980–1990. Producer Steve Lillywhite spent five days with the band to re-record vocals and guitar parts.

At Alison's request, profits from the single went to her favoured charity, Chernobyl Children International.

Release
A version by New York gospel choir, The New Voices of Freedom, appears on the soundtrack to the 1988 Bill Murray film Scrooged. It was recorded following U2's performance of "I Still Haven't Found What I'm Looking For" with the choir at Madison Square Garden, which appears on the band's 1988 album Rattle and Hum.

To promote the release of the single in 1998, Island Records distributed "Sweetest Thing" chocolate bars, wrapped to look like the single, throughout Europe. They have become a very valuable collectors item among U2 fans during the 2000s. The song reached number one in Canada, Iceland, and Ireland, number three in the United Kingdom, number six in Australia, number 63 on the US Billboard Hot 100, number nine on the Billboard Modern Rock Tracks chart, and number 31 on the Billboard Mainstream Rock Tracks chart.

Live performances
The song made its live debut on the opening night of the Elevation Tour, and was played occasionally over the first and second legs. It was then not played again until the Innocence + Experience Tour, where once again it only made occasional appearances over the course of the tour.

Performances on the Elevation Tour featured Bono playing the piano parts while the Edge played electric guitar. On the Innocence + Experience Tour, it was played on the e-stage in a stripped-down version, with the Edge playing acoustic guitar and Bono joining in on the piano about halfway through the song.

Music video

The video was directed by Kevin Godley. It features Bono taking Hewson on a carriage ride along the Georgian mile in Dublin, from Fitzwilliam Place onto Upper Fitzwilliam Street, enlisting various performers along the way in an effort to apologise to her. The performers featured include Riverdance, Boyzone, Steve Collins, the Artane Boys Band, Chippendales dancers, and the Celtic Knights. The other three members of U2—The Edge, Adam Clayton, Larry Mullen Jr.—Norman Hewson (Bono's brother) and Dik Evans (The Edge's brother) also appear in the video.

Track listings

The back cover lists the third track simply as a live version of "An Cat Dubh".

Personnel
 Bono – lead vocals
 The Edge – piano, guitar, backing vocals
 Adam Clayton – bass guitar
 Larry Mullen Jr. – drums

Charts and certifications

Weekly charts

Year-end charts

Decade-end charts

Certifications

Release history

References

1987 songs
1998 singles
Irish Singles Chart number-one singles
RPM Top Singles number-one singles
Canadian Singles Chart number-one singles
Music videos directed by Kevin Godley
Number-one singles in Iceland
Island Records singles
Rock ballads
Song recordings produced by Brian Eno
Song recordings produced by Daniel Lanois
Song recordings produced by Steve Lillywhite
Songs written by Adam Clayton
Songs written by Bono
Songs written by the Edge
Songs written by Larry Mullen Jr.
U2 songs